The 1904-05 French Rugby Union Championship was won by SBUC, who defeated Stade Français in the final.

The 1904-05 championship was the second consecutive time the two teams had met in the final match, with SBUC victorious on both occasions.

Regional Chamipnship 
 Seine: Stade Français (won the final against Le Havre A.C. (8-0) ).
 Garonne: SBUC
 Rhone: FC Lyon

Provincial final

Final 

SBUC:  Jean Guiraud, Pascal Laporte, Maurice Bruneau, Marc Giacardy, Hélier Thil, Campbell Cartwright, André Lacassagne, Max Kurtz (cap), Marcel Laffitte, Jacques Duffourcq, Alphonse Massé, R.Dachicourt, Jauréguiber, Louis Mulot, Herman Gross-Droz

Stade Français: Henri Marescal, Charles Vareilles, Stuart Forsyth, Francis Mouronval, Pierre Mouronval, Lhuerre, Guy de Talencé, Charles Beaurin, Allan Henry Muhr, Camille Galliot, André Vergès, Marcel Communeau, Georges Jérôme, A. Bertjemann, Paul Dedet

External links
 Compte rendu de la finale de 1905, sur lnr.fr

1905
France
Championship